Cynthia Whitcomb is an American television screenwriter and teacher. She has been nominated for numerous awards including the Emmy, the Edgar and the Humanitas Prize.

Background
In 1969, Whitcomb graduated from Pasadena High School in Pasadena, California where she studied drama under Abel Franco.  While she was a freshman at UCLA, Franco gave her one of her first professional writing assignments.  She received $25 in advance and $25 upon completion to write, "Here," a spoof of the musical, Hair. However, the play was never produced due to censorship.

Selected credits

Television

Theatre
 Holidazed, Written with Marc Acito

References

External links
Official website

American women screenwriters
1951 births
Screenwriters from California
Living people
Writers from Pasadena, California
University of California, Los Angeles alumni
UCLA Film School alumni
American women dramatists and playwrights
American television writers
Screenwriting instructors
American women television writers
Pasadena High School (California) alumni
21st-century American women